Morus nigra, called black mulberry (not to be confused with the blackberries that are various species of Rubus), is a species of flowering plant in the family Moraceae that is native to southwestern Asia and the Iberian Peninsula, where it has been cultivated for so long that its precise natural range is unknown. The black mulberry is known for its large number of chromosomes.

Description
Each cell has 308 chromosomes in total, and exhibits tetratetracontaploidy (44x), meaning that its genome contains seven chromosomes, and each cell has 44 copies of each.

Black mulberry is richly flavoured, similar to the red mulberry (Morus rubra) rather than the more insipid fruit of the white mulberry (Morus alba). Mulberry fruit color derives from anthocyanins.

Sometimes other mulberry species are confused with black mulberry, particularly black-fruited individuals of the white mulberry. Black mulberry may be distinguished from the other species by the uniformly hairy lower surface of its leaves.

Cultivation and uses
Black mulberries (Morus nigra) are thought to have originated in the mountainous areas of Mesopotamia and Persia (i.e. Armenian highlands). Black mulberry is planted, and often naturalised, west across much of Europe, including Ukraine, and east into China. Now they are widespread throughout Armenia, Afghanistan, Iraq, Iran, India, Pakistan, Syria, Lebanon, Jordan, Palestine, Israel, and Turkey.

The fruit is edible and the tree has long been cultivated for this property. Both the tree and the fruit are known by the Persian-derived names toot (mulberry) or shahtoot (شاه توت) (king's or "superior" mulberry), or, in Arabic, as shajarat tukki. Often, jams and sherbets are made from the fruit in this region.

In Europe, the largest-documented local concentration of black mulberries may be found in the vineyards of Pukanec in Slovakia, which contain 470 black mulberry trees.

The black mulberry was imported into Britain in the 17th century in the hope that it would be useful in the cultivation of silkworms (Bombyx mori). It was unsuccessful in that enterprise because silkworms prefer the white mulberry. However, the plantings have left a legacy of large and old trees in many country house gardens and it was listed in the Award of Garden Merit of the Royal Horticultural Society until 2013. It was much used in folk medicine, especially in the treatment of ringworm.

Gallery

References

External links

 Flora of China: Morus nigra

nigra
Plants described in 1753
Taxa named by Carl Linnaeus
Trees of Western Asia
National symbols of Kyrgyzstan
Edible fruits
Fruit trees
Plant dyes